Blount Springs is an unincorporated community in Blount County, Alabama United States.

Geography

History
Blount Springs's mineral springs and rural setting made it a summer resort for thousands of wealthy people from Alabama, Tennessee, Georgia, Mississippi, Louisiana, and more from 1820 to the 1930s. The sulfur springs were renowned for their curative properties. More than the health benefits, Old Blount became known for its social scene as the gentry of the Black Belt and later the City of Birmingham took advantage of the cooler temperatures of the area during the heat and malarial conditions of late summer.

The Goff House and Duffee House were antebellum hotels of renown there. Col. J. F. B. Jackson built a resort hotel, the Jackson House, in 1872 around the sulfur springs. In 1887, Jackson sold the land and hotel to James Sloss and his brother, Mack Sloss, who renamed it Blount Springs Hotel. It became one of the finest hotels in the Southeast and was known for its hospitality and the highest quality food and parties.

Besides hotels, cottages were available for guest use as well as horseback riding, gambling (permitted by state law only at water places), ten pins and plenty of spirits. Many of the regulars owned their own cottages and spent every season (July through October) at the springs. Visitors to the springs occasionally made the four-mile trip to the northeast to visit the nearby Bangor Cave.

Celebrities and important people visited and politicians galore spoke and vacationed there. Governors of several states, Senators and other office holders and seekers were constantly visiting. Teddy Roosevelt once made an appearance. One of the largest stars of the day, Lillian Russell, came for an extended visit and created quite a stir after she enjoyed a day of sunbathing and was covered in chigger bites.  It took every ounce of butter in the town and surrounding countryside to sooth the most famous body in the country. Diamond Jim Brady, New York restaurateur and gentleman friend of Miss Russell, also accompanied her on the trip.

The resort burned down on June 3, 1915, after a fire started in the kitchen of the main hotel and it also burned much of the town. The fire marked the end of the resort and the town, combined with the changing of the railroad so that it didn't go through town anymore and the easy access to other entertainments. Those that owned cottages and a few others still came for the next several years. There was an attempt to locate a Veteran's Hospital that failed. Other development plans by members of the Drennen family for a large village and resurgence of the springs never came to fruition. Blount Springs became sparsely populated and largely undeveloped for several decades.

In the late 1980s, Blount Springs Recolonization Partners began work on The Village at Blount Springs, the first stage of a  planned gated community designed by Duany, Plater-Zyberk architects on the former site of the Blount Springs resort.

Numerous springs emerge at the site of the former resort, each containing a different mineral (white sulfur, red sulfur, and lithium, to name a few). When the resort was still in operation, water from the springs was sold in blue glass bottles. Shards of these bottles fill the soil near the foundations of the resort, and are said to bring good luck.

A post office operated under the name Blount Springs from 1830 to 1957.

Demographics

Blount Springs appeared on the 1880 U.S. Census as an incorporated town having 156 residents. It was the only time it appeared on census rolls.

References

External links
 www.blountsprings.com

Unincorporated communities in Blount County, Alabama
Unincorporated communities in Alabama
1830 establishments in Alabama